Zephyr is a video game developed and published by New World Computing for DOS.

Gameplay
Zephyr is a shoot 'em up that takes place in an arena, and comes with network capabilities.

Reception
Next Generation reviewed the game, rating it three stars out of five, and stated that "for those net fiends who have the urge to blow away friends over the phone line, there is some good gaming to be played here."

Reviews
PC Gamer (US) (March 1995)
Computer Gaming World (Mar, 1995)
PC Games - Feb, 1995
PC Player - Dec, 1994
World Village (Gamer's Zone) (1995)
Coming Soon Magazine (Mar, 1995)
Génération 4 (Jan, 1995)

References

External links

1994 video games
DOS games
DOS-only games
New World Computing games
Shoot 'em ups
Sprite-based first-person shooters
Video games developed in the United States